"By Any Other Name" is the 22nd episode of the second season of the American science fiction television series Star Trek. Written by D.C. Fontana and Jerome Bixby (based on Bixby's story) and directed by Marc Daniels, it was first broadcast February 23, 1968. 

In the episode, beings from another galaxy commandeer the Enterprise in an attempt to return home.

The title is taken from a line spoken by Juliet in William Shakespeare's play Romeo and Juliet: "that which we call a rose / By any other name would smell as sweet", a line quoted by Captain Kirk during the episode.

Plot
The Federation starship USS Enterprise responds to a distress call from an uncharted planet. A landing party beams down to locate the source, and promptly finds a humanoid male and female, Rojan and Kelinda of the Kelvan Empire, who immediately paralyze Kirk and the landing party and order Kirk to surrender the Enterprise. Rojan tells Kirk that the Kelvans originate from the Andromeda Galaxy, and have come to find planets suitable for conquest in the Milky Way galaxy. As their own ship had been destroyed by the negative-energy barrier at the galactic rim, they need the Enterprise to make the 300-year return journey. Three other Kelvans transport aboard the Enterprise, and quickly gain control of the ship.

Rojan orders the landing party to a cave guarded by Kelinda. Mr. Spock uses his Vulcan telepathic ability to lure her into the cave, where Kirk knocks her unconscious and seizes her control belt. Their freedom is short-lived, however, and as punishment Rojan orders the Kelvan Hanar to activate his belt, transforming two of the landing team members to small cuboctahedral blocks of a chalk-like substance. Rojan picks up the blocks and crushes one to dust, killing Yeoman Thompson. He then transforms the other block (Lt. Shea) back into human form.

Back in their cell, Spock relates the experience of his mental contact with Kelinda. The Kelvans, it seems, are not humanoid after all, but have taken human form for convenience; they are actually huge creatures with hundreds of tentacles. (So alien were they, and so powerful their minds, that he had been thrown back out of the mind meld.)

Kirk and Spock decide to try to adapt McCoy's neural scanning equipment into a countermeasure to the Kelvans' paralysis field. As a pretext for beaming back to the ship, Spock feigns illness by placing himself into a deep trance. The Kelvans transport the rest of the landing party and themselves to the ship shortly afterwards.

Spock determines that there is no hope of penetrating the paralysis field projector's casing. Instead, he has Scott rig the matter/antimatter system to explode on contact with the barrier if Kirk so orders. Kirk opts not to.

Once the ship has crossed the galactic barrier, the Kelvans reduce all personnel except Kirk, Scott, Spock, and McCoy into chalk-like blocks. Spock remembers more from his mental contact with Kelinda and reveals that the Kelvans in their natural form have very weak senses and emotions, but in their present form they are having human reactions. Kirk decides to use their inexperience with physical and emotional stimuli against them.

Scott introduces the Kelvan engineer Tomar to alcoholic beverages, McCoy injects Hanar with a "supplement" that is actually a stimulant, and Kirk begins a flirtation with Kelinda, provoking feelings of jealousy in Rojan. Kirk is eventually able to goad Rojan into attacking him, and, in the course of the fight, points out that Rojan is behaving like a human and that his descendants who reach the Andromeda Galaxy will be alien inferiors in the eyes of the Kelvans. Realizing Kirk is correct, Rojan relinquishes control of the ship to Kirk, who then gives the order to return "home" to our galaxy. The world on which Rojan and his people were marooned is suggested as their new home.

Reception
In 2018, Collider ranked this episode the 9th best original series episode.

References

External links

"By Any Other Name" Review of the remastered version of the episode at TrekMovie.com

Star Trek: The Original Series (season 2) episodes
1968 American television episodes
Television episodes written by D. C. Fontana
Things named after Shakespearean works
Television episodes directed by Marc Daniels
Television episodes written by Jerome Bixby